Nogging, an architectural term, may refer to:

 Brick nog, (nogged, nogging) term used for the filling in-between wall framing in buildings
 Nogging or dwang, a horizontal bracing piece used to give rigidity

See also
 Noggin (disambiguation)